The 2021 FIBA Under-16 African Championship was an international basketball competition held in Cairo, Egypt from 6–15 August 2021. It served as a qualifier for the 2022 FIBA Under-17 Basketball World Cup in La Nucia and Alicante in Spain.

Venue

Participating teams

Group phase
All times are local Egypt Standard Time (UTC-1:00).

Knockout phase

Semifinals

Third-place match

Final

Final ranking

External links
 Official website

References

2021 in basketball
2021 in youth sport
August 2021 sports events in Egypt
2021
International basketball competitions hosted by Egypt
Sports competitions in Cairo
Youth sport in Egypt